The 2020–21 Tahiti Ligue 2 was the second highest division of the Tahitian football league. The competition is organized and administered by  Fédération Tahitienne de Football.

Participating teams

Thirteen clubs participated in the 2020–21 edition of the competition.

Central Sport B
Excelsior B
Manu Ura B
Mataiea B
Olympic Mahina 2
A.S. Papara
A.S. Papenoo
Pirae B
A.S. Taiarapu
AS Tamarii Punaruu
AS Tamarii Temanava
Tefana B
Vénus B

Final classification

References

2